The Thailand women's national futsal team represents Thailand in international futsal competitions and is controlled by the Football Association of Thailand.

Results and fixtures

Legend

2018

Players

Current squad
 The following players were named on date month year for the 2015 AFC Women's Futsal Championship.
 Caps and goals accurate up to and including date month year.

Competitive record

Women's Futsal World Tournament

AFC Women's Futsal Asian Cup

Asian Indoor and Martial Arts Games

Southeast Asian Games

See also
 Thailand national men's futsal team
 Thailand Futsal League

References

Asian women's national futsal teams
Futsal
National
2005 establishments in Thailand
Women's football in Thailand